Perumpadavu is a village in the Kannur district of Kerala, India. Perumpadavu comes under ward no.1 of the Chapparapadavu Grama Panchayat.

Location
Perumpadavu is located 43 km away from Kannur city, 22 km north of Taliparamba town and 28 km east of Payyanur town.

Culture
Karippal Nagam is a temple dedicated to the serpent god. It is located at karippal near perumpadavu in the Kannur district. The Ayilyam festival is most important for this temple. The festival falls on Ayilyam star of the Dhanu month in the Malayalam Calendar. Devotees visit in large numbers, during the festive seasons.

Education
 BVJM HSS Perumpadavu
 Oxford English school, Perumpadavu
 St. Joseph English school Perumpadave 
 GLPS Thalavil
 SVUP school, Karippal
 MAMLP school Vellakkad

Transportation
National Highway (NH 66) passes through Taliparamba town. Mumbai and Mangalore can be accessed on the northern side and Cochin and Trivandrum from the southern side. The road to the east connects to Mysore and Bangalore. 
The nearest railway station is 31 km away Payyanur  on Shoranur-Mangalore Section under Southern Railway.
The nearest airport is 54 km away Kannur International Airport.

See also
 Chapparapadavu
 Eramam
 Kooveri
 Kuttur (Payyanur)
 Mathamangalam
 Therthally
 Thimiri
 Vellora

References 

Villages near Taliparamba